The discography of the Levellers, a British rock band, consists of 12 studio albums, three live albums, four compilation albums and 34 singles.

Albums

Studio albums

Re-issues
All of the following were remastered with new artwork and released 16 July 2007:
 Levelling the Land (2 disc, with BBC's recording of Glastonbury 1992)
 Levellers (with additional tracks)
 Zeitgeist (with additional tracks)
 Mouth to Mouth (with additional tracks)
 Hello Pig (with unreleased tracks)
 A Weapon Called the Word (re-mastered) On The Fiddle Recordings, 2010
 Levelling the Land (Box set inc. 2LP, 2CD, DVD) On The Fiddle Recordings, 2016

Live albums

Compilation albums

Singles

Videography

Video albums

References

Discographies of British artists